The Imperial Seal of Japan or National Seal of Japan, also called the ,  or , is one of the national seals and a crest (mon) used by the Emperor of Japan and members of the Imperial Family. It is a contrast to the Paulownia Seal used by the Japanese government.

History 
During the Meiji period, no one was permitted to use the Imperial Seal except the Emperor of Japan, who used a 16-petalled chrysanthemum with sixteen tips of another row of petals showing behind the first row. Therefore, each member of the Imperial family used a slightly modified version of the seal. Shinto shrines either displayed the imperial seal or incorporated elements of the seal into their own tag.

Earlier in Japanese history, when Emperor Go-Daigo, who tried to break the power of the shogunate in 1333, was exiled, he adopted the seventeen-petalled chrysanthemum in order to differentiate himself from the Northern Court's Emperor Kōgon, who kept the imperial 16-petalled mon.

Description 
The symbol is a yellow or orange chrysanthemum with black or red outlines and background. A central disc is surrounded by a front set of 16 petals. A rear set of 16 petals are half staggered in relation to the front set and are visible at the edges of the flower. An example of the chrysanthemum being used is in the badge for the Order of the Chrysanthemum. 

Other members of the Imperial Family use a version with 14 single petals, while a form with 16 single petals is used for Diet members' pins, orders, passports, and other items that carry or represent the authority of the Emperor. The Imperial Seal is also used on the standards of the Imperial Family.

Gallery

See also 

 National seals of Japan
 Chrysanthemum Throne
 Imperial Seal of Korea
 Imperial Seal of Manchukuo
 Order of the Chrysanthemum
 Mon (emblem)

References

External links 
 

Japanese monarchy
Japan
National symbols of Japan
Empire of Japan
Japanese coats of arms
Japanese heraldry